Property of the Republic is a 1971 Soviet two-part adventure film directed by Vladimir Bychkov. The detective story takes place during the Civil War in Russia. The picture was the 44th most attended domestic film in the Soviet Union.

Plot 
Spring 1918. Tarakanov, managing the estate of Prince Tikhvinsky, with the help of the former court fencing teacher Shilovsky and homeless boy Keshka, steals from abandoned mansion collection of paintings and sculptures. Hopping across the border, criminals roam the circus troupe, and they are being tailed by an employee of Criminal Investigation,   Makar Ovchinnikov.

Cast
 Oleg Tabakov as Makar Ovchinnikov
 Andrei Mironov  as Shilovsky aka Marquis
 Vitya Galkin as homeless Keshka
 Yevgeniy Yevstigneyev as Carl Genrikhovich Vitol
 Spartak Mishulin as Ilya Tarakanov
 Mikhail  Ekaterininskiy as Director of the Museum
 Olga Zhiznyeva as Duchess Tikhvinskaya
 Yuri Tolubeyev as criminologist Prokofy Filippovich Dobrovo
 Igor Kvasha as Ataman Lagutin
 Vladimir Grammatikov as magician
 Rogvold Sukhoverko as Commissioner Kochet
Georgy Millyar as old railroad
 Arkady Tolbuzin as director
Elmira Zherzdeva

Release 
Vladimir Bychkov's film watched 47.1 million viewers, which is 67 results in the history of Soviet film distribution.

References

External links 
 

1971 films
Russian Civil War films
Gorky Film Studio films
Soviet drama films
1971 drama films
1970s Russian-language films